RuPaul's Drag Race is an American reality series wherein RuPaul and a panel of judges set contestants drag-related challenges.

Artios Awards

Art Directors Guild Awards

Costume Designers Guild Awards

Critics' Choice Television Awards
The Critics' Choice Television Awards are presented annually since 2011 by the Broadcast Television Journalists Association. The awards were launched "to enhance access for broadcast journalists covering the television industry".

Critics' Choice Real TV Awards
The Critics' Choice Real TV Awards, presented by the Broadcast Television Journalists Association and NPACT, which recognizes excellence in nonfiction, unscripted and reality programming across broadcast, cable and streaming platforms.

Dorian Awards
The Dorian Awards are presented by GALECA: The Society of LGBTQ Entertainment Critics and go to film and television both mainstream and LGBTQ-centric. 

 Note: From 2009, the group honored film and TV together, but in 2020 began to award movies and programs at separate times of the year. This explains the overlap of award categories that year.

GLAAD Awards

Hollywood Critics Association TV Awards

Make-Up Artists and Hair Stylists Guild Awards

MTV Movie & TV Awards

NAACP Image Awards

NewNowNext Awards

People's Choice Awards

Primetime Emmy Awards
The Primetime Emmy Awards are given by the Academy of Television Arts & Sciences, an organisation founded in 1946, for television shows broadcast or available for download and streaming in America. The main award ceremony is the Primetime Emmy Award, whilst Creative Arts Emmy Awards are given in technical, creative, and craft categories, and International Emmy Awards are presented to shows airing outside of the US.
{| class="wikitable" style="width:85%;"
|-
! width=5%|Year
! style="width:40%;"| Category
! style="width:40%;"| Nominated work
! style="width:10%;"| Result
! width=5%|
|-
| style="text-align: center;" | 2015
| Outstanding Makeup for a Multi-Camera Series or Special (Non-Prosthetic)
| Mathu Andersen (for "ShakesQueer")
| 
| rowspan="71" style="text-align: center;" |     
|-
| rowspan="2" style="text-align: center;" | 2016
| Outstanding Host for a Reality or Reality-Competition Program
| RuPaul
| 
|-
| Outstanding Costumes for a Variety, Nonfiction, or Reality Program
| Zaldy (for "Keeping It 100!")
| 
|-
| rowspan="8" style="text-align: center;" | 2017
| Outstanding Competition Program
| RuPaul's Drag Race
| 
|-
| Outstanding Unstructured Reality Program
| RuPaul's Drag Race: Untucked
| 
|-
| Outstanding Host for a Reality or Reality-Competition Program
| RuPaul
| 
|-
| Outstanding Casting for a Reality Program
| Goloka Bolte and Ethan Petersen
| 
|-
| Outstanding Costumes for a Variety, Nonfiction, or Reality Program
| Zaldy and Perry Meek (for "Oh. My. Gaga!")
| 
|-
| Outstanding Hairstyling for a Multi-Camera Series or Special
| Hector Pocasangre (for "Oh. My. Gaga!")
| 
|-
| Outstanding Makeup for a Multi-Camera Series or Special (Non-Prosthetic)
| Jen Fregozo, Nicole Faulkner and Natasha Marcelina (for "Oh. My. Gaga!")
| 
|-
| Outstanding Picture Editing for a Structured or Competition Reality Program
| Jamie Martin, John Lim and Michael Roha (for "Oh. My. Gaga!")
| 
|-
| rowspan="12" style="text-align: center;" | 2018
| Outstanding Reality-Competition Program
| RuPaul's Drag Race
| 
|-
| Outstanding Unstructured Reality Program
| RuPaul's Drag Race: Untucked
| 
|-
| Outstanding Host for a Reality or Reality-Competition Program
| RuPaul
| 
|-
| Outstanding Directing for a Reality Program
| Nick Murray (for "10s Across the Board")
| 
|-
| Outstanding Casting for a Reality Program
| Goloka Bolte and Ethan Petersen 
| 
|-
| Outstanding Cinematography for a Reality Program
| Michael Jacob Kerber (for "10s Across the Board")
| 
|-
| Outstanding Costumes for a Variety, Nonfiction, or Reality Program
| Zaldy (for "10s Across The Board" / Costumes: RuPaul's gowns")
| 
|-
| Outstanding Makeup for a Multi-Camera Series or Special (Non-Prosthetic)
| Nicole Faulkner, Jen Fregozo, Natasha Marcelina and David Petruschin (for "10s Across the Board)
| 
|-
| Outstanding Picture Editing for a Structured or Competition Reality Program
| Jamie Martin, Drew Forni, John Lim and Michael Roha (for "10s Across the Board")
| 
|-
| Outstanding Hairstyling for a Multi-Camera Series or Special
| Hector Pocasangre and Gabriel Villarreal (for "10s Across the Board")
| 
|-
| Outstanding Creative Achievement in Interactive Media Within an Unscripted Program
| Sarah DeFilippis, Brittany Travis, Ray Hunt, Jackie Rappaport and Courtney Powell (for "Season 10 Ruveal")
|
|-
|  Outstanding Picture Editing for an Unstructured Program
| Lousine Shamamian (for RuPaul's Drag Race: Untucked – "10s Across the Board")
| 
|-
| rowspan="13" style="text-align: center;" | 2019
|  Outstanding Competition Program
| RuPaul's Drag Race
| 
|-
| Outstanding Unstructured Reality Program
| RuPaul's Drag Race: Untucked
| 
|-
| rowspan="2"|Outstanding Short Form Nonfiction or Reality Series
| RuPaul's Drag Race: Out of the Closet
| 
|-
| RuPaul's Drag Race: Portrait of a Queen
| 
|-
| Outstanding Host for a Reality or Reality-Competition Program
| RuPaul
| 
|-
| Outstanding Directing for a Reality Program
| Nick Murray (for "Whatcha Unpackin?")
| 
|-
| Outstanding Casting for a Reality Program
| Goloka Bolte and Ethan Petersen 
| 
|-
| Outstanding Cinematography for a Reality Program
| Jake Kerber (for "Trump: The Rusical")
| 
|-
| Outstanding Costumes for a Variety, Nonfiction, or Reality Program
| Zaldy Goco (Costumes: RuPaul) and Art Conn (Costumes: Michelle Visage) (for "Trump: The Rusical")
| 
|-
| Outstanding Hairstyling for a Multi-Camera Series or Special
| Hector Pocasangre (for "Trump: The Rusical")
| 
|-
| Outstanding Makeup for a Multi-Camera Series or Special (Non-Prosthetic)
| Adam Burrell, Nicole Faulkner, Jen Fregozo, Natasha Marcelia and Karen Mitchell (for "Trump: The Rusical")
| 
|-
| Outstanding Picture Editing for a Structured or Competition Reality Program
| Jamie Martin, Michael Lynn Deis, Julie Tseselsky Kirschner, John Lim, Ryan Mallick, Michael Roha and Corey Ziemniak
| 
|-
|  Outstanding Picture Editing for an Unstructured Program
| Kendra Pasker, Shayna Casey and Stavros Stavropoulos (for RuPaul's Drag Race: Untucked)
| 
|-
| rowspan="13" style="text-align: center;" | 2020
| Outstanding Competition Program
| RuPaul's Drag Race
| 
|-
| Outstanding Unstructured Reality Program
| RuPaul's Drag Race: Untucked
| 
|-
|Outstanding Short Form Nonfiction or Reality Series
| RuPaul's Drag Race: Out of the Closet
| 
|-
| Outstanding Host for a Reality or Reality-Competition Program
| RuPaul
| 
|-
| Outstanding Directing for a Reality Program
| Nick Murray (for "I'm That Bitch")
| 
|-
| Outstanding Casting for a Reality Program
| Goloka Bolte and Ethan Petersen 
| 
|-
| Outstanding Cinematography for a Reality Program
| Michael Jacob Kerber, Jon Schneider, Jay Mack Arnette II, Mario Panagiotopoulos, Gregory Montes, Brett Smith, David McCoul and Justin Umphenour
| 
|-
| Outstanding Costumes for a Variety, Nonfiction, or Reality Program
| Zaldy Goco (for "I'm That Bitch")
| 
|-
| Outstanding Contemporary Hairstyling for a Variety, Nonfiction or Reality Program
| Curtis Foreman and Ryan Randall (for "I'm That Bitch")
| 
|-
| Outstanding Contemporary Makeup for a Variety, Nonfiction or Reality Program (Non-Prosthetic)
| Natasha Marcelina, David Petruschin, Jen Fregozo and Nicole Faulkner (for "I'm That Bitch")
| 
|-
| Outstanding Picture Editing for a Structured or Competition Reality Program
| Jamie Martin, Michael Roha, Paul Cross, Michael Deis and Ryan Mallick (for "I'm That Bitch")
| 
|-
| Outstanding Sound Mixing for a Nonfiction or Reality Program (Single or Multi-Camera)
| Glenn Gaines, Ryan Brady, Erik Valenzuela, Sal Ojeda (for "I'm That Bitch")
| 
|-
|  Outstanding Picture Editing for an Unstructured Program
| Kendra Pasker, Yali Sharon, Kate Smith (for RuPaul's Drag Race: Untucked "The Ball Ball")
| 
|-
| rowspan="11" style="text-align: center;" | 2021
| Outstanding Competition Program
| RuPaul's Drag Race
| 
|-
| Outstanding Unstructured Reality Program
| RuPaul's Drag Race Untucked
| 
|-
| Outstanding Production Design for a Variety, Reality or Competition Series
| James McGowan and Gianna Costa 
| 
|-
| Outstanding Casting for a Reality Program
| Goloka Bolte and Ethan Petersen
| 
|-
| Outstanding Cinematography for a Reality Program
| Michael Jacob Kerber, Jay Mack Arnette II, Jason Cooley, Pauline Edwards, Ade Oyebade, Mario Panagiotopoulos, Jon "Sarge" Schneider, Brett Smith, Justin Umphenour
| 
|-
| Outstanding Directing for a Reality Program
| Nick Murray 
| 
|-
| Outstanding Picture Editing for a Structured Reality or Competition Program
| Jamie Martin, Paul Cross, Ryan Mallick, Michael Roha 
| 
|-
| Outstanding Picture Editing for an Unstructured Reality Program
| Kellen Cruden, Yali Sharon, Shayna Casey 
| 
|-
| Outstanding Contemporary Hairstyling for a Variety, Nonfiction or Reality Program
| Curtis Foreman and Ryan Randall 
| 
|-
| Outstanding Contemporary Makeup for a Variety, Nonfiction or Reality Program (Non-Prosthetic)
| David "Raven" Petruschin, Nicole Faulkner and Jen Fregozo 
| 
|-
| Outstanding Host for a Reality or Competition Program
| RuPaul
| 
|-
| rowspan="10" style="text-align: center;" | 2022
| Outstanding Competition Program
| RuPaul's Drag Race
| 
|-
| Outstanding Unstructured Reality Program
| RuPaul's Drag Race: Untucked
| 
|-
| Outstanding Sound Mixing for a Nonfiction or Reality Program (Single or Multi-Camera)
| Erik Valenzuela, Davild Nolte and Glenn Gaines 
| 
|-
| Outstanding Casting for a Reality Program
| Goloka Bolte and Ethan Petersen
| 
|-
| Outstanding Directing for a Reality Program
| Nick Murray 
| 
|-
| Outstanding Production Design for a Variety, Reality or Competition Series
| Gianna Costa and Allison Spain 
| 
|-
| Outstanding Cinematography for a Reality Program
| Michael Jacob Kerber, Jay Mack Arnette II, Jason Cooley, Pauline Edwards, Mario Panagiotopoulos, Brett Smith, Jeremiah Smith, Justin Umphenour and Jon Schneider
| 
|-
| Outstanding Picture Editing for a Structured Reality or Competition Program
| Jamie Martin, Paul Cross, Ryan Mallick and Michael Roha 
| 
|-
| Outstanding Host for a Reality or Competition Program
| RuPaul
| 
|-
| Outstanding Short Form Nonfiction or Reality Series
| Ray Hunt, Eric Dimitratos, Joseph Gerbino, Robert Diminico, Christina D'ambrosio and Michelle Visage (Whatcha Packin)
| 
|-
|}

 Note''': In 2019, the spin-off series RuPaul's Drag Race: All Stars received a nomination for Outstanding Picture Editing for a Structured or Competition Reality Program for the episode "Jersey Justice" competing with the main series. In 2022, RuPaul's Drag Race All Stars received another nomination in the same category, competing with the main series, for the episode "Halftime Headliners". Also in 2022, the section RuPaul's Drag Race Whatcha Packin' with Michelle Visage'' was nominated for Outstanding Short Form Nonfiction or Reality Series.

Producers Guild of America Awards

Queerty Awards

Reality Television Awards

Realscreen Awards

Television Critics Association Awards

Other awards

Notes

References

RuPaul's Drag Race
Awards